Jharkhand Police is the law enforcement agency for the state of Jharkhand, India. Jharkhand Police was formed in 2000. Jharkhand Police is headed by Director General of Police and headquartered in Ranchi, Jharkhand.
Jharkhand police have 4 levels of Joining. 
The Top positions are filled by Indian Police Service Officers recruited by the Union Public Service Commission. The Next Level of Recruitment is at Class II Level via D.S.P Rank recruited by the Jharkhand Public Service Commission. Non-Gazetted officers are recruited at the sub inspector level by the Jharkhand Subordinate Service Commission. Other posts are filled by conducting recruitment rallies or direct recruitment examinations.
The Jharkhand Police has nearly a Strength of about 149 IPS Officers. Against this sanctioned strength the State has only 100 IPS Officers allotted to it as on 2015 by the Ministry of Home Affairs(MHA).
Jharkhand is among the top Indian states for total recruitment. The current DGP of Jharkhand Police is Niraj Sinha.

Organisational structure
Its organisational structure is divided into Field Posting and Non-Field Postings. The Field Postings are divided into 24 district police units in the state. The Head of the Jharkhand Police is the Director General of Police and under him are the Different Departments of:-
Special Branch
Crime Investigation Department(CID)
Headquarters
Modernisation
Jharkhand Armed Police(JAP) 
Law and Order
These Departments are headed by IPS Officers of the Additional Director General of Police Rank. They are assisted by Officers of the ranks of Inspector Generals of Police, Deputy Inspector General of Police, Superintendent of Police and other subordinate Ranks.

Hierarchy

Officers

 Director General of Police (DGP)
 Additional Director General of Police (ADG) 
 Inspector General of Police (IG)
 Deputy Inspector General of Police (DIG) 
 Senior Superintendent of Police (SSP)
 Superintendent of Police (SP)
 Additional Superintendent of Police 
 Assistant SP (IPS) or Deputy SP (Jharkhand Police Service)

Sub-ordinates
 Inspector of Police 
 Sub-Inspector of Police 
 Assistant Sub-Inspector of Police 
 Head Constable 
 Senior Constable 
 Constable

Notable IPS officers (started out before the creation of Jharkhand Police)
Gopal Achari an IPS officer of the 1966 Batch.
Vishnu Dayal Ram an IPS Officer of the 1973 Batch.
Rajiv Jain an IPS Officer of the 1980 Batch.
Asha Sinha an IPS Officer of the 1982 Batch.
Ajoy Kumar an IPS Officer of the 1986 Batch.
Rameshwar Oraon an IPS Officer of the 1972 Batch.

See also
Law enforcement in India
State Armed Police Forces

References

External links
 

State law enforcement agencies of India
Government of Jharkhand
2000 establishments in Jharkhand
Government agencies established in 2000